Amblyseius proresinae is a species of mite in the family Phytoseiidae.

References

proresinae
Articles created by Qbugbot
Animals described in 1970
Taxa named by Wolfgang Karg